Let Me in Your Life is the twentieth studio album by American singer Aretha Franklin, released on February 25, 1974, by Atlantic Records.

It was one of Aretha's top-selling Atlantic Records albums. The album hit #1 on Billboards R&B albums chart and just missed the Top 10 of Billboards main album chart, narrowly missing Gold certification. Featuring three hit singles, it is regarded as one of Franklin's best Atlantic recordings.  It was issued on compact disc through Rhino Records in 1994.

 Track listing 
Information is based on the album's Liner NotesFranklin, Aretha.   "Let Me in Your Life" (Original Album Notes).  Atlantic.   1974.Side One "Let Me in Your Life" (Bill Withers) – 3:24
 "Every Natural Thing" (Eddie Hinton) – 2:31
 "Ain't Nothing Like the Real Thing" (Nickolas Ashford, Valerie Simpson) – 3:47
 "I'm in Love" (Bobby Womack) – 2:48
 "Until You Come Back to Me (That's What I'm Gonna Do)" (Clarence Paul, Stevie Wonder, Morris Broadnax) – 3:26
 "The Masquerade is Over" (Herbert Magidson, Allie Wrubel) – 4:27Side Two'
 "With Pen in Hand" (Bobby Goldsboro) – 5:03
 "Oh Baby" (Aretha Franklin) – 4:55
 "Eight Days On the Road" (Jerry Ragovoy, Mike Gayle) – 2:59
 "If You Don't Think" (Aretha Franklin) – 3:50
 "A Song for You" (Leon Russell) – 5:33

Personnel
Information is based on the album's Liner Notes
Main
 Aretha Franklin – vocals (1, 6, 8, 10–11, lead on 2–5, 7, 9), acoustic piano (2, 5, 7–9), Fender Rhodes (10-11)
 Ken Bichel – synthesizer (5)
 Margaret Branch – backing vocals (2, 5, 7, 9)
 Ann S. Clark – backing vocals (2, 5, 7, 9)
 Stan Clarke – bass guitar (1, 3–4, 6)
 Judy Clay – backing vocals (3-4)
 Eumir Deodato – Fender Rhodes (1), acoustic piano
 Cornell Dupree – guitar (2, 4, 7–11)
 Gwen Guthrie – backing vocals (4)
 Donny Hathaway – keyboards (3, additional on 7), acoustic piano (4, 6), Fender Rhodes (5, 8)
 Cissy Houston – backing vocals (3-4)
 Bob James – Hammond organ (1), keyboards (3)
 Ralph MacDonald – percussion (1-4, 6–11)
 Rick Marotta – drums (1, 3–4, 6)
 Hugh McCracken – guitar (5)
 Pancho Morales – percussion (2, 5–6, 8–9)
 Bernard Purdie – drums (2, 5, 7–11)
 Chuck Rainey – bass guitar (2, 5, 7, 9)
 Sylvia Shemwell – backing vocals (3)
 Myrna Smith – backing vocals (3)
 Pat Smith – backing vocals (2, 5, 7, 9) 
 David Spinozza – guitar (1, 3–4, 6)
 Richard Tee – acoustic piano (1, 9), Hammond organ (2, 5, 10–11), Fender Rhodes (2), synthesizer, additional keyboards (10)
 Deirdre Tuck – backing vocals (4)
 Willie Weeks – bass guitar (8, 10–11)

Arif Mardin's Horn Section
Joe Farrell – tenor saxophone (2), flute (5)
Ernie Royal – trumpet (10)

Arif Mardin's String Section
Gene Orloff – concertmaster (1-2, 5, 7–11)

Production
 Producers – Aretha Franklin (all tracks); Arif Mardin and Jerry Wexler (1-6, 9); Tom Dowd (7-8, 10–11)
 Arrangers – Eumir Deodato (rhythm & strings on 1), William Eaton (music on 3–4, 6), Arif Mardin (percussion on 1, horns 1–2, 4–5, 7–11, strings on 1–2, 4–5, 7–11)
 Engineers – Phil Ramone (tracks 1, 3, 4 & 6); Gene Paul (tracks 2 & 8–11); Lew Hahn (Track 5); Howard Albert and Ron Albert (track 7)
 Recorded at Atlantic Studios and A&R Studios (New York City); Criteria Studios (Miami, Florida)
 Remixed by Arif Mardin at Atlantic Studios
 Mastered by Gene Paul at Atlantic Studios
 Photography – Joel Brodsky

See also
List of number-one R&B albums of 1974 (U.S.)

References

1974 albums
Aretha Franklin albums
Albums arranged by Arif Mardin
Albums arranged by Eumir Deodato
Albums produced by Jerry Wexler
Atlantic Records albums
Rhino Records albums
Albums with cover art by Joel Brodsky